Anthophora villosula is a species of anthophorine bee in the family Apidae.

References

Further reading

 

Apinae
Articles created by Qbugbot
Insects described in 1854